Peter John O'Grady (1921 – 14 June 1993) was an Irish Gaelic footballer who played for club side Fermoy and at inter-county level with the Cork senior football team.

Playing career
After beginning his Gaelic football career at school's level with the local CBS, O'Grady was a part of the Fermoy minor team that won the County Championship in 1938. As a result, he captained the Cork minor team to their very first Munster Minor Championship success in 1939. O'Grady subsequently established himself on the Fermoy senior team and won a County Championship medal in 1945. He had earlier claimed a junior championship title as a hurler with Oldcastletown. After first lining out for Cork as a member of the junior team, O'Gardy was a substitute on the senior team that won the Munster Championship in 1943. He won a second provincial title from the bench in 1945, before ending the season by 
again lining out as a substitute when Cork claimed the All-Ireland title after a defeat of Cavan in the final.

Personal life and death
O'Grady was associated with the motor trade all his life, beginning with Cavanagh's of Fermoy and finishing his career with Pope's Garage in Cork. He died on 14 June 1993.

Honours
Oldcastletown
Cork Junior Hurling Championship: 1943

Fermoy
Cork Senior Football Championship: 1945

Cork
All-Ireland Senior Football Championship: 1945 
Munster Senior Football Championship: 1943, 1945
Munster Minor Football Championship: 1939 (c)

References

1921 births
1993 deaths
Dual players
Fermoy Gaelic footballers
Cork inter-county Gaelic footballers
People from Fermoy